A nuclear lightbulb is a hypothetical type of spacecraft engine using a gaseous fission reactor to achieve nuclear propulsion. Specifically it would be a type of gas core reactor rocket that uses a quartz wall to separate nuclear fuel from coolant/propellant. It would be operated at temperatures of up to 22,000°C where the vast majority of the electromagnetic emissions would be in the hard ultraviolet range. Fused silica is almost completely transparent to this light, so it would be used to contain the uranium hexafluoride and allow the light to heat reaction mass in a rocket or to generate electricity using a heat engine or photovoltaics.
This type of reactor shows great promise in both of these roles.

Rocket engine
As a rocket engine it, like all nuclear rocket designs, can greatly exceed the exhaust speed and specific impulse of a chemical rocket. However, it also does not involve the release of any radioactive material from the rocket, unlike open cycle designs which would cause nuclear fallout if used in a planetary atmosphere (e.g. Project Orion). The theoretical specific impulse (Isp) range from 1500 to 3000 seconds.

Electrical power generation
As a method to generate electricity, nuclear lightbulbs are extremely efficient because higher-temperature heat contains more Gibbs free energy than the low-temperature heat produced in current fossil-fuel plants and water-cooled nuclear reactors.

References 

Nuclear reactors
Nuclear spacecraft propulsion
Nuclear technology